Pietro Angelini (born 7 December 1971 in L'Aquila) is an Italian former professional tennis player.

Active in the 1990s, Angelini is a native of L'Aquila and reached a best world ranking of 253, competing mostly in satellite and Challenger tournaments. He featured in the qualifying draw for the 1993 French Open and made an ATP Tour main draw appearance at the 1998 Campionati Internazionali di San Marino, losing at the first stage in both.

ITF Futures titles

Singles: (1)

References

External links
 
 

1971 births
Living people
Italian male tennis players
People from L'Aquila
Sportspeople from the Province of L'Aquila